Saint Clateus (died 64 AD) was an early Christian martyr. He was an early Christian bishop in Brescia, Italy and was martyred during the persecutions of Christians by Nero.

Notes

64 deaths
Saints from Roman Italy
Bishops of Brescia
1st-century Christian martyrs
Year of birth unknown